The Kong Lung Store in Kilauea, Hawaii was originally built, in c.1941, to be the Kilauea Plantation store.  It was listed on the National Register of Historic Places in 1993.

It is a  building, the last stone building built by the Kilauea Sugar Company, built of field stone up to its lower gable level, that was a replacement for a previous wood building.

It is deemed significant as an example of masonry construction in Kilauea, usually used for domestic architecture, here adapted for a commercial building.  And it is significant for association with the sugarcane plantation and the provision of goods to its workers.  The store was managed independently from the plantation, by Chew Lung, son of Lung Wan Chee (b. 1860) who managed the first, predecessor store.  It was originally open from 2am to 5am, operated by workers who then went to work in the plantation fields.

References

Commercial buildings on the National Register of Historic Places in Hawaii
Commercial buildings completed in 1941
Kauai County, Hawaii
1941 establishments in Hawaii
National Register of Historic Places in Kauai County, Hawaii